Arthur Ashe was the defending champion, but lost in the quarterfinals this year.

Adriano Panatta won the title, defeating Jimmy Connors 3-6, 6-4, 7-5 in the final.

Seeds

  Arthur Ashe (quarterfinals)
  Jimmy Connors (final)
  Guillermo Vilas (first round)
  Björn Borg (semifinals)
  Ilie Năstase (quarterfinals)
  Jan Kodeš (first round)
  Roscoe Tanner (quarterfinals)
  Adriano Panatta (champion)
  Eddie Dibbs (second round)
  Tom Okker (third round)
  Onny Parun (semifinals)
  Dick Stockton (second round)
  Vitas Gerulaitis (second round)
  Karl Meiler (third round)
  Bob Hewitt (third round)
  Jeff Borowiak (first round)

Draw

Finals

Top half

Section 1

Section 2

Bottom half

Section 3

Section 4

References

External links
 Main draw

Stockholm Open
1975 Grand Prix (tennis)